Leticia Marcela Brédice (born July 26, 1975) is an Argentine actress and singer.

Career
Brédice won Best New Actress Award from the Argentine Film Critics Association in 1993 for Anni Ribelli. In 1997, she has also won Best Supporting Actress Award by the same association for her work on Cenizas del paraíso. She appeared in Fabián Bielinsky's 2000 Heist film Nine Queens, and has appeared on stage in several productions, including Panorama Desde El Puente, Lolita, Marta Stutz, Seis Personajes En Busca de Un Actor, and Closer.

Personal life 
From 2005 to 2008, Brédice was in a relationship with the musician Juan Pablo Sanguinetti. She gave birth to their child, a son, on August 11, 2005. From 2009 to 2015, she was in a relationship with the multimedia artist Mariano Airaldi. From 2015 to 2020, she was in a relationship with Federico Parrilla.

Filmography

Movies

Television

Theater

Television Programs

Awards and nominations

External links
 
 

1972 births
Argentine film actresses
Living people
Place of birth missing (living people)
Participants in Argentine reality television series
Bailando por un Sueño (Argentine TV series) participants